Corbetta may refer to:

Corbetta, Lombardy, a commune in the province of Milan, Italy
Corbetta (mountain), a mountain of the canton of Fribourg, in Switzerland
Corbetta, a type of magazine (artillery).  A Corbetta magazine is of concrete construction and is shaped like a beehive or dome.  The domed shape is used for only the Corbetta ECM design. The interior wall is approximately three times the height of the magazine. There are currently no Dome designs approved for new construction.
Francesco Corbetta, a guitarist and composer of the seventeenth century
Marco Corbetta, a game programmer